Andrew Bernal (born 16 May 1966) is a former professional soccer defender who played in Australia, England and Spain. He was later a football agent and personal manager for David Beckham. In 2021, he wrote and released his autobiography Riding Shotgun – The Original Wizard of Oz. He currently works for the A-League football club Central Coast Mariners as Head of Athletic Development, Football Coach and Vibe Manager.

Early life
Bernal was born in 1966 in Canberra to Spanish-born parents.

Playing career

Club career
After graduating from the Australian Institute of Sport, Bernal became the first Australian to play for a La Liga club when he joined Sporting Gijon. Gijon had intended to play him in their youth teams, however as an Australia underage representative, he was classified as a foreigner, meaning he was not eligible. He went onto play almost 100 games of Spanish club football whilst on loan to Albacete Balompié and Xerez. Faced with compulsory military service as a Spanish citizen, Bernal chose to leave Spain and signed for Ipswich Town in September 1987. Returning to England from an Australian holiday, it was found that Bernal was playing on a student holiday visa and his English stint was cut shot.

In August 1988, Bernal signed with Sydney Olympic ahead of the 1989 National Soccer League.

In 1994, he joined English team  Reading in England for a reported £30,000 fee. He was part of the Reading team that narrowly missed out on promotion to the Premier League in the 1994–95 season. Bernal retired at the end of the 1999–2000 season, having made 187 league appearances.

International career
Bernal has also played for the Australian national team on 21 occasions between 1989 and 1996, 13 times in full international matches and eight in B internationals.

References

External links
 OzFootball profile
 Andy Bernal Interview

1966 births
Living people
Sportspeople from Canberra
Soccer players from the Australian Capital Territory
Australian people of Spanish descent
Association football defenders
Australian soccer players
Australian expatriate soccer players
Australia international soccer players
La Liga players
National Soccer League (Australia) players
Albacete Balompié players
Ipswich Town F.C. players
Reading F.C. players
Sporting de Gijón players
Sydney Olympic FC players
Xerez CD footballers
Australian Institute of Sport soccer players